The Eden Baronetcy, of West Auckland in the County of Durham, and the Eden Baronetcy, of Maryland in North America, are two titles in the Baronetage of England and Baronetage of Great Britain respectively that have been united under a single holder since 1844.

The family traces its ancestry to Robert de Eden (d. 1413) but probably lived in the Durham area since the twelfth century. They managed to keep their lands despite joining the Revolt of the Northern Earls in 1569 and being Royalists in the Civil War of the 1640s.

The Eden Baronetcy of West Auckland was created in the Baronetage of England on 13 November 1672 for Robert Eden, subsequently Member of Parliament for County Durham. He was the son of Colonel John Eden, a supporter of the Royalist cause in the Civil War. The second and fourth Baronets also represented County Durham in the House of Commons. The fifth Baronet assumed the additional surname of Johnson. On his death in 1844, unmarried, the title was inherited by Sir William Eden, 4th Baronet, of Maryland (see below), who became the sixth Baronet of West Auckland as well. He served as High Sheriff of Durham in 1848. The ninth/seventh Baronet is a Conservative politician. On 3 October 1983 he was created a life peer as Baron Eden of Winton, of Rushyford in the County of Durham, in the Peerage of the United Kingdom. Windlestone Hall was the family seat from the 17th to the 20th century.

The Eden Baronetcy of Maryland in North America, was created in the Baronetage of Great Britain on 19 October 1776 for Robert Eden, the last Governor of Maryland under British rule. He was the second son of the third Baronet of West Auckland. The third Baronet was killed at the Battle of New Orleans in 1814. His cousin, the aforementioned fourth Baronet, succeeded as sixth Baronet of West Auckland in 1844. See above for further history of the titles.

Eden baronets, of West Auckland (1672)
Sir Robert Eden, 1st Baronet (died 1720)
Sir John Eden, 2nd Baronet (died 1728)
Sir Robert Eden, 3rd Baronet (died 1755)
Sir John Eden, 4th Baronet (1740–1812)
Sir Robert Johnson-Eden, 5th Baronet (1774–1844)
Sir William Eden, 6th and 4th Baronet (1803–1873) (had previously succeeded as fourth baronet of Maryland)
Sir William Eden, 7th and 5th Baronet (1849–1915)
Sir Timothy Calvert Eden, 8th and 6th Baronet (1893–1963)
Sir John Benedict Eden, 9th and 7th Baronet (1925–2020) (created Baron Eden of Winton in 1983)
The Hon. Sir Robert Frederick Calvert Eden, 10th and 8th Baronet (born 1964)

The heir presumptive is the present holder's brother Hon. John Edward Morton Eden (born 1966).
The heir presumptive's heir apparent is his son Nicholas Cazenac Eden (b. 1997).

Eden baronets, of Maryland (1776)
Sir Robert Eden, 1st Baronet (1741–1784)
Sir Frederick Morton Eden, 2nd Baronet (died 1809)
Sir Frederick Eden, 3rd Baronet (died 1814)
Sir William Eden, 6th and 4th Baronet (1803–1873) (succeeded as 6th Baronet of West Auckland in 1844)
See above for further succession

Other notable members of the family
Several other members of the Eden family have also gained distinction:-
 William Eden, 1st Baron Auckland, was the third son and Morton Eden, 1st Baron Henley, the fifth son of the third Baronet, of West Auckland (see Baron Auckland and Baron Henley for more information on these branches of the family).
 Robert Eden, third son of the second Baronet of Maryland, was Primus of Scotland and Bishop of Moray, Ross and Caithness.
 George Morton Eden, fourth son of the second Baronet of Maryland, was a lieutenant-general in the British Army.
 Charles Eden (1808–1878), fifth son of the second Baronet of Maryland, was a vice-admiral in the Royal Navy.
 George Wilfrid Eden (1903–1986), son of Lieutenant-Colonel John Henry Eden, eldest son of Reverend John Patrick Eden, son of Thomas Eden (b. 1787), eldest son of Thomas Eden, fourth son of the third Baronet of West Auckland, was a brigadier in the British Army.
William Hassell Eden, a General in the British Army and Colonel of the 90th Regiment of Foot.
Archibald James Fergusson Eden, an officer of the Oxford and Buckinghamshire Light Infantry and Brigadier General in the British Army during WWI.
William Rushbrooke Eden, a Royal Artillery officer and Brigadier General in the British Army during WWI.
 Robert Eden (1836–1907), a grandson of Morton Eden, 1st Baron Henley, fought in the American Civil War with the 37th Wisconsin Volunteers, was editor of the Northwestern newspaper, and became senior engineer with the Edison Light Co.
 Rodney Eden (1853–1940), third son of the aforementioned John Patrick, was Bishop of Wakefield from 1897 to 1928.
 Henry Charles Hamilton Eden  (1883–1963), son of Charles Hamilton Eden, fourth son of the aforementioned John Patrick, was a brigadier in the British Army.
 Anthony Eden, 1st Earl of Avon, Prime Minister of the United Kingdom, was the third son of the seventh Baronet of West Auckland and the fifth Baronet of Maryland (see the Earl of Avon for more information on this branch of the family).

Eden family tree

 Sir Robert Eden, 1st Baronet, of West Auckland (d. 1720) m. Margaret Lambton
 Sir John Eden, 2nd Baronet (1677–1728) m. Catherine Shafto
 Sir Robert Eden, 3rd Baronet (ca.1715–1755) m. Mary Davison
 Sir John Eden, 4th Baronet (1740–1812) m. (1) Catherine Thompson; m. (2) Dorothea Johnson
 Sir Robert Johnson-Eden, 5th Baronet (1774–1844)
 Sir Robert Eden, 1st Baronet, of Maryland (1741–1784) m. Caroline Calvert (b. ) (daughter of Charles Calvert, 5th Baron Baltimore)
 Sir Frederick Eden, 2nd Baronet (1766–1809) m. Anne Smith
 Sir Frederick Eden, 3rd Baronet (–1814)
 Caroline Eden (–1854) m. Vice-Admiral Hyde Parker (1784–1854)
 Sir William Eden, 6th and 4th Baronet (1803–1873) m. Elfrida Susanna Harriet Iremonger (1825–1885)
 Sir William Eden, 7th and 5th Baronet (1849–1915) m. Sybil Frances Grey (1867–1945)
 Elfrida Marjorie Eden (1887–1943) m. Leopold Greville, 6th Earl of Warwick
 Charles Greville, 7th Earl of Warwick m. (1) Rose Bingham; m. (2) Mary Kathleen Hopkinson; m. (3) Janine Josephine Detry de Mares
 John "Jack" Eden (1888–1914)
 Sir Timothy Eden, 8th and 6th Baronet (1893–1963)
 John Eden, Baron Eden of Winton (1925–2020) m. (1) Belinda Jane Pascoe; m. (2) Margaret Ann Gordon (former wife of the 9th Earl of Perth)
 Sir Robert Eden, 10th and 8th Baronet (b. 1964)
 Hon. John "Jack" Eden (b. 1966)
 Anthony Eden, Earl of Avon (1897–1977) m. (1) Beatrice Beckett; m. (2) Clarissa Spencer-Churchill
 Simon Gascoigne Eden (1924–1945)
 Robert Eden (b. and d. 1928)
 Nicholas Eden, 2nd Earl of Avon (1930–1985)
 Nicholas William Eden (1900–1916)
 Robert Eden (1804–1886) m. Emma Park
 George Morton Eden (1806–1862)
 Sir Charles Eden (1808–1878) m. (1) Emma Williams; m. (2) Fanny Cecilia Grenville
 William Eden, 1st Baron Auckland (1745–1814) m. Eleanor Elliot (daughter of Sir Gilbert Elliot, 3rd Baronet)
 Hon. Eleanor Eden (1777–1851) m. Robert Hobart, 4th Earl of Buckinghamshire
 Hon. Catharine Eden (1778–1810) m. Nicholas Vansittart, 1st Baron Bexley
 Hon. Elizabeth Eden (1780–1847) m. Francis Osborne, 1st Baron Godolphin
 Hon. William Eden (1782–1810)
 George Eden, 1st Earl of Auckland (1784–1849)
 Robert Eden, 3rd Baron Auckland (1799–1870) m. Mary Hurt (–1872)
 William Eden, 4th Baron Auckland (1829–1890) m. (1) Lucy Walbanke Childers (–1870); m (2) Lady Mabel Finch-Hatton (1849–1872) (daughter of George Finch-Hatton, 11th Earl of Winchilsea); m. (3) Edith Eden (daughter of Sir William Eden, 6th and 4th Baronet)
 William Eden, 5th Baron Auckland (1859–1917) m. Sybil Constance Hutton (d. 1955)
 Frederick Eden, 6th Baron Auckland (1895–1941) m. (1) Susan Livingstone Hartridge; m. (2) Constance Caroline Hart-Faure
 Hon. George Eden (1861–1924)
 Geoffrey Eden, 7th Baron Auckland (1891–1955) m. Dorothy Ida Harvey (d. 1964)
 Terence Eden, 8th Baron Auckland (1892–1957) m. Evelyn Vane Drummond (d. 1971)
 Ian Eden, 9th Baron Auckland (1926–1997) m. Dorothy Margaret Manser JP (–2006)
 Robert Eden, 10th Baron Auckland (b. 1962)
 Hon. Ronald Eden (1931–2006) m. Alicia Claire Needham
 Henry Eden (b. 1958)
 Morton Eden, 1st Baron Henley (1752–1830) m. Elizabeth Henley (d. 1821) (daughter of Robert Henley, 1st Earl of Northington)
 Frederick Eden (1784–1823)
 Robert Henley, 2nd Baron Henley (1789–1841) m. Harriet Eleanora Peel (daughter of Sir Robert Peel, 1st Baronet)
 Anthony Henley, 3rd Baron Henley (1825–1898) m. (1) Julia Emily Augusta Peel; m. (2) Clara Campbell Lucy Jekyll
 Frederick Henley, 4th Baron Henley (1849–1923) m. Augusta Frederica Langham (1847–1905) (sister of Sir Herbert Langham, 12th Bt.)
 Anthony Henley, 5th Baron Henley (1858–1925) m. (1) Georgiana Caroline Mary Williams; m. (2) Emmeline Stuart Maitland
 Brig. Gen. Hon. Anthony Henley (1873–1925) m. Hon Sylvia Stanley OBE (d. 1980) (daughter of Edward Stanley, 4th Baron Stanley of Alderley)
 Francis Eden, 6th Baron Henley (1877–1962) m. Lady Dorothy Howard (d. 1968) (daughter of George Howard, 9th Earl of Carlisle)
 Michael Eden, 7th Baron Henley (1914–1977) m. (1) Elizabeth Hobhouse; m. (2) Nancy Mary Walton
 Oliver Eden, 8th Baron Henley (b. 1953) m. Caroline Patricia Sharp
  Hon. John Eden (born 1988)

See also
Baron Auckland
Baron Henley
Earl of Avon

References

External links

www.edendiaries.co.uk

Eden
Eden
1672 establishments in England
1776 establishments in Great Britain
Eden family